Erik Josefsson may refer to:

Erik Josefsson (activist), Swedish internet activist
Erik Josefsson (ice hockey), ice hockey player in Swedish Elitserien